The Solomon Islands national under-20 football team is the national U-20 team of the Solomon Islands and is controlled by the Solomon Islands Football Federation (SIFF)

History 
The Solomon Islands national under-20 football team took part in the OFC U-20 Championship tournament 8 times (1994, 1998, 2001, 2005, 2007, 2011, 2014 and 2016) and their best results were in 2005 and 2011 when the team reached the final, but unfortunately they lost against Australia and New Zealand respectively.

Competition record

OFC
The OFC Under 20 Qualifying Tournament is a tournament held once every two years to decide the only two qualification spots for the Oceania Football Confederation (OFC) and its representatives at the FIFA U-20 World Cup.

FIFA U-20 World Cup

Current Technical Staff

Current squad
The following players were called up for the 2022 OFC U-19 Championship from 7 to 20 September 2022. Names in italics denote players who have been capped for the Senior team.

Caps and goals as of 19 September 2022 after the game against New Caledonia.

Fixtures & Results

2016

2018

References

External links
 Islands football federation official website

Under-20
Oceanian national under-20 association football teams